The Race Against Cancer (TRAC) was a one-off international motorsport event held in the United Kingdom. Conceived by marketing executive, Rick Osborn and corporate financier, Matt Roberts the event was organised to raise money for Cancer Research UK and also be a modern take on the famous Masters Karting Paris Bercy events from the mid 1990s.

The event was held on 25 November 2007 at Rye House in Hertfordshire. The concept behind the event was to bring together a collection of famous international racing drivers and motorcyclists together to race in purpose built karts.

The drivers praised the event saying that they enjoyed the opportunity to race drivers and riders from other formulae than their own. The event was also famously well backed, the sponsors list included Alpinestars, Bowers & Wilkins, Moet et Chandon, Google and Shell.

It is rumoured that a second TRAC event came close to being held in 2010 and the organisers have said in recent years that if there is a demand for the event they could bring it back in 2017 for a 10-year anniversary meeting.

2007 - First TRAC event 

The event was held at Rye House, situated in Hertfordshire, United Kingdom. It featured a variety of motorsport stars including Formula 1 driver (then reigning Euro F3 champion) Romain Grosjean, double BTCC champion Alain Menu, GP2 winner Javier Villa and MotoGP rider Mika Kallio. Multiple motorbike and  Formula One world champion John Surtees and  Formula One world champion Damon Hill championed the inaugural event, calling for it to become a regular fixture on the motorsport calendar.

Results 

Superpole Qualifying:
1st - Javier Villa
2nd - Riki Christodoulou 
3rd - Matt Hamilton

Heat #1:
1st - Javier Villa
2nd - Ben Hanley
3rd - Sam Bird

Heat #2:
1st - Alain Menu
2nd - Sam Bird
3rd - Riki Christodoulou

Grand Final:
1st - Javier Villa
2nd - Sam Bird
3rd - Riki Christodoulou
4th - Thor-Christian Ebbesvik
5th - Tim Sugden
6th - Jon Lancaster
7th - Jonathan Kennard
8th - Paul Rees
9th - Chaz Davies
10th - Rob Huff

Fastest Lap - Riki Christodoulou - 43.35s

Additional positions of interest: 11th Alain Menu, 12th Romain Grosjean, 18th Chris Harris and 20th Bradley Smith.

James Jakes, Mika Kallio, Tom Onslow-Cole and Ben Hanley all suffered accidents forcing them out of the race.

TRAC 2010 

In July 2010 rumours circulated throughout the motorsport community that TRAC would return later that year. Press articles from the time believed that a deal was close to being struck between the organisers, The o2, headline sponsors Shell and Sky Sports.

Despite having several drivers lined up including many of the original line-up, in an interview with BBC Radio Manchester Rick Osborn commented that "Due to the current economic climate in European motorsport, a deal that would be significantly beneficial to the charity is not available at this time."

Matt Roberts also clarified the situation in an interview with RMC (France) quoted by saying "Whilst myself and Rick have held conversations with the Monégasque government, they are just that... conversations."

Talent spotting 

TRAC is famous for its early scouting of talent, largely due to the detailed industry knowledge held by the organisers and their support team. Romain Grosjean and Sam Bird have gone on to be employed in Formula 1, Jon Lancaster is a regular starter in GP2 and Alain Menu and Rob Huff have both continued their successful careers in saloon car racing.

Future for TRAC 

There is no firm plan for TRAC to return to the motorsport calendar, however, the organisers have said that should interest continue to persist in the event then they would consider an anniversary event in 2017 on UK soil.

Media 

The race received much acclaimed media press coverage and was featured in Top Gear Magazine, Autosport, EVO, GPUpdate, Motorsport News, Karting Magazine, Pistonheads and many more. The race was televised and aired in June 2008 in over 15 European countries, the show was produced by James Knopp and his production company, Blueflair Productions. The show was presented by Emma Rigby and featured interviews with Damon Hill, Alain Menu and Rob Huff.

Official sites 

Automotive events